Gabriela Belem Agúndez Garcia (born 4 August 2000) is a Mexican diver. She represented Mexico at the 2020 Summer Olympics in Tokyo, Japan in the individual 10 metre platform and synchronized 10 metre platform (with Alejandra Orozco), winning a bronze medal.

Other competition results 
2014 Central American and Caribbean Games, 10 metre platform, bronze medal
2017 World Aquatics Championships, 10 metre platform, 15th place
2017 World Aquatics Championshisp, synchronized 10 metre platform, 9th place (with Samantha Jiménez)
2018 Central American and Caribbean Games, 10 metre platform, bronze medal
2018 Summer Youth Olympics, 10 metre platform, bronze medal 
2018 Summer Youth Olympics, 3 metre springboard, fifth place 
2018 Summer Youth Olympics, mixed team, tenth place (with Antonio Volpe of Italy)
2019 World Aquatics Championships, 10 metre platform, 32nd place
2019 World Aquatics Championships, synchronized 10 metre platform, ninth place (with Alejandra Orozco)
2019 Pan American Games, 10 metre platform, sixth place
2019 Pan American Games, synchronized 10 metre platform, silver medal (with Alejandra Orozco)

References 

Living people
2000 births
Mexican female divers
Olympic divers of Mexico
Divers at the 2020 Summer Olympics
Central American and Caribbean Games bronze medalists for Mexico
Competitors at the 2014 Central American and Caribbean Games
Central American and Caribbean Games medalists in diving
Divers at the 2018 Summer Youth Olympics
Sportspeople from Baja California Sur
People from La Paz, Baja California Sur
Olympic bronze medalists for Mexico
Olympic medalists in diving
Medalists at the 2020 Summer Olympics
Pan American Games medalists in diving
Pan American Games silver medalists for Mexico
Divers at the 2019 Pan American Games
Medalists at the 2019 Pan American Games
21st-century Mexican women